Archips bachmanus is a moth of the family Tortricidae. It is found in Vietnam.

The wingspan is 20 mm. The ground colour of the forewings is brownish, with paler submedian interfascia. The strigulation (fine streaking) is brown. There is a weak, pinkish violet gloss. The markings consist of a reduced to slender rust-brown blotch. The hindwings are pale orange, but greyish brown in the anal half, with fine, brownish
strigulation in the apex area.

Etymology
The name refers to the type locality: Bạch Mã.

References

Moths described in 2009
Archips
Moths of Asia
Taxa named by Józef Razowski